Scott R. Shipley (born May 15, 1971 in Poulsbo, Washington) is an American slalom canoeist who competed at the international level from 1988 to 2004.

He won three silver medals in the K1 event at the ICF Canoe Slalom World Championships, earning them in 1995, 1997, and 1999. He won the overall World Cup title in K1 three times (1993, 1995 and 1997). In 2010, he became U.S. national champion in C2.

Shipley also competed in three Summer Olympics, earning his best finish of fifth in the K1 event in Sydney in 2000.

With Mechanical Engineering degrees from Georgia Institute of Technology, Bachelors 2001, Masters 2002, he retired from full-time competition for a job with S2O Design and Engineering, in Boulder, Colorado. In that job, he assisted Gary Lacy (the engineer of record) in the design of the $37 million U.S. National Whitewater Center in Charlotte, North Carolina, which opened in 2006. In a redesign of the man-made whitewater park concept, Shipley is patenting Rapidblocs—plastic structures that can be moved to create different rapids. Rapidblocs are utilized in the London Olympic Whitewater Park, whose rapids his company, S2o, designed. The Rapidblocs allow the park to adjust their rapids to appeal to a wider audience than the Olympic Kayakers that will utilize them in the games.

World Cup individual podiums

References

External links
S2o Design website

1971 births
American male canoeists
Canoeists at the 1992 Summer Olympics
Canoeists at the 1996 Summer Olympics
Canoeists at the 2000 Summer Olympics
Living people
Olympic canoeists of the United States
Medalists at the ICF Canoe Slalom World Championships
People from Poulsbo, Washington